Ivan Netov (born 22 October 1968) is a Bulgarian judoka. He competed at the 1992 Summer Olympics and the 1996 Summer Olympics.

References

1968 births
Living people
Bulgarian male judoka
Olympic judoka of Bulgaria
Judoka at the 1992 Summer Olympics
Judoka at the 1996 Summer Olympics
People from Panagyurishte